Pierluigi Borghetti (born 18 November 1984 in Brescia) is an Italian footballer who plays for Anconitana.

Biography
Born in Brescia, Lombardy, Borghetti started his professional career at the Province of Brescia team Lumezzane, where he was promoted from its Berretti under-20 team. In July 2005 he joined Serie B club Crotone along with Nicola Ferrari, which he joined in co-ownership deal, from Brescia. In June 2007 Borghetti acquired the remain 50% registration rights. On 2 February 2009 he joined Ternana.

In July 2011 he joined Perugia.

International career
Borghetti played for Italy U-20 C team in 2004–05 Mirop Cup. He also received a call-up against England C.

References

External links
 Lega Serie B Profile 
 Football.it Profile 

Italian footballers
Serie B players
Brescia Calcio players
F.C. Lumezzane V.G.Z. A.S.D. players
F.C. Crotone players
Ternana Calcio players
A.C. Perugia Calcio players
Association football central defenders
Footballers from Brescia
1984 births
Living people